Tushaun Tyreece-Walters (born 25 March 2000) is an English footballer who plays as a forward for Herne Bay on loan from Maidstone United.

Early life
Born in London, Walters started his career with Tottenham Hotspur at the age of 8. He spent eight years with the North London club, before being released by email at the age of 16. Following his release, Walters spent a season with non-league Abbey Rangers, and also trained at the academy of Chelsea and England player Reece James' father, Nigel James.

With Walters' links to Chelsea via Nigel James, he was invited for to train with the under-23s, and signed a six-month contract in August 2017, alongside fellow non-league players Adebambo Akinjogbin and Renedi Masampu. After one season with The Blues, in which he featured 13 times for the under-18 side, scoring once, Walters was released by Chelesa.

Club career
After leaving Chelsea, Walters dropped down to the Isthmian League's Greenwich Borough, where he spent one season, scoring a total of 19 goals. After Greenwich Borough's relegation to the ninth tier, Walters joined Isthmian League side Herne Bay in 2019. He started well for the Kent-based team, scoring multiple times in his first season.

After two seasons with Herne Bay, Walters again jumped up the English football pyramid, signing with National League South side Maidstone United in 2021. Walters returned to Herne Bay on loan in October 2022.

Career statistics
.

References

2000 births
Living people
Footballers from Greater London
English footballers
Association football forwards
Tottenham Hotspur F.C. players
Chelsea F.C. players
Greenwich Borough F.C. players
Herne Bay F.C. players
Maidstone United F.C. players
Tonbridge Angels F.C. players
National League (English football) players
Isthmian League players
Black British sportspeople
English people of Nigerian descent